The Qiantang River Bridge is a road and railway bridge across the Qiantang River at Hangzhou in Zhejiang Province, China.

History
The bridge was designed by Mao Yisheng and built by Dorman Long. Construction, which started on 8 August 1934 was completed on 29 September 1937. It is a two-tier truss bridge with 16 spans and is 1,072 metres long.

On 17 November 1937, during the Battle of Shanghai, the Bridge Construction Office were ordered to make preparations to blow up the bridge to delay the advancing Imperial Japanese Army.

See also
 List of bridges in China

References

Sources

Gallery of images

Bridges in Zhejiang
Road-rail bridges
Bridges completed in 1937
1937 establishments in China
Major National Historical and Cultural Sites in Zhejiang
Tourist attractions in Hangzhou
Double-decker bridges